The Wolfson family is a British Jewish family known for its business, philanthropic, and political activities. The family owes its initial fame to Sir Isaac Wolfson, who built the Great Universal Stores retail empire and created the Wolfson Foundation.

The family is of Polish-Jewish and Russian-Jewish ancestry and has branches in the U.K., the U.S., and Israel. The original family business, GUS, was eventually demerged into Home Retail Group, which included Argos and Homebase, and credit company Experian. Other businesses led or controlled by family members include the retailers Burberry and Next, and the pharmaceutical company Shaklee.

History
Family patriarch Solomon Wolfson immigrated from Białystok to Glasgow, Scotland, with his wife Nechi (née Wilamowski) at the end of the 19th century. He was a furniture maker and Jewish community leader, later appointed Justice of the Peace. His son Isaac Wolfson built the family retail business and founded the Wolfson Foundation and the Wolfson Family Charitable Trust. Isaac was joined at GUS by his brother Charles Wolfson and later succeeded by his son Leonard Wolfson, and his nephews David Wolfson and Victor Barnett. By World War II the family was based in London, with the Samuel Wolfson branch having moved to Israel. During the Blitz, Solomon's daughter Edith took many of the family children (the third generation) to seek refuge in the United States for the duration of the war. After World War II various family members moved permanently to New York. Today, family members live in London, New York, and Israel.

Philanthropy

A family descended from devout Orthodox Jews, the Wolfsons followed the religious and charitable example of their patriarch Solomon and the middle-European community from which he came. Isaac Wolfson is quoted as having said, "No man should have more than £100,000. The rest should go to charity." The Wolfson Foundation was established in 1955, endowed with shares in the family businesses, to support and promote excellence in education, science & medicine, the arts & humanities, and health & disability. The Foundation has awarded over £900 million (£1.9 billion in real terms) in grants to more than 11,000 projects throughout the U.K., including the founding endowments for Wolfson College, Oxford and Wolfson College, Cambridge. The Foundation also operates the Wolfson History Prize. The Wolfson Economics Prize is individually sponsored by Simon Wolfson.

Through the Wolfson Family Charitable Trust and various forms of personal giving, the family have also been among Israel's earliest and most significant supporters, as well as major supporters of Jewish life in Britain and New York. In Israel, the Charitable Trust has been a primary supporter of the Weizmann Institute, the Kiryat Wolfson developments, Heichal Shlomo and the Great Synagogue in Jerusalem, and Wolfson Medical Center in Tel Aviv, among many other projects. Family members were also founding benefactors of Bar Ilan University and The Israel Museum, as well as Lincoln Square Synagogue and Fifth Avenue Synagogue in New York.

Hereditary titles and honours
Created in 1962, the Wolfson Baronetcy was one of the last baronetcies and among the last non-royal hereditary titles created in the United Kingdom. In addition, three family members have been created life peers as Lord Wolfson, and many family members and their spouses have received honours for their charitable services.

Family tree

Solomon Wolfson J.P. (1868–1941), immigrated from Polish-Russia to Scotland, he is the namesake of Heichal Shlomo; m. Nechi Williamowsky/Wilamowski
 Samuel Wolfson (1896–1973), emigrated to Israel
  Rabbi Aviezer Wolfson
 Sir Isaac Wolfson, 1st Baronet (1897–1991), m. Edith Specterman
 Leonard Wolfson, Baron Wolfson (1927–2010), succeeded his father as chairman of GUS and the Wolfson Foundation; m. Ruth Sterling and had four children and then  married to Estelle Jackson 
 Dame Janet Wolfson De Botton (1952–), art collector and philanthropist; m. Michael Green and then Gilbert de Botton
 Rebecca Green (1974–)
  Catherine Green (1976–)
 Hon. Laura Wolfson (1954–), chairman of the Wolfson Family Charitable Trust; m. Barry Townsley
 Alexandra Townsley (1977–)
 Georgina Townsley (1979–)
 Charles Townsley (1984–)
  Isabella Townsley (1994–)
 Hon. Deborah Wolfson Davis (1959–), screenwriter of The Favourite; m. Glen Davis
 Hon. Elizabeth Wolfson (1966–), m. Daniel Peltz OBE
 Max Peltz
  Francesca Peltz (1992–)
 Charles Wolfson (1899–1970), president and later chairman of G.U.S. Canada; m. Hylda Jarvis
 Jane Wolfson, international board chairman of Bar-Ilan University; m. Jerome Stern and then Dr. Don Lebell
 David Wolfson, Baron Wolfson of Sunningdale (1935–2021), chief of staff to Margaret Thatcher and the third Wolfson family chairman of GUS; m. Baroness Rawlings (they divorced with no children) and then Susan Davis
 Simon Wolfson, Baron Wolfson of Aspley Guise (1967–), chief executive of Next and founder of the Wolfson Economics Prize; m. Eleanor Shawcross, economic advisor to George Osborne and daughter of biographer William Shawcross
 Hon. Andrew Wolfson (1969–)
 Lily Wolfson (2007–)
  Hon. Deborah Wolfson (1973–)
  Jeannie Wolfson (1901–1974), m. Max Williams
 Edith Wolfson (1902–1997), m. Esmond Barnett of London and then Ralph Hyman of New York
 Adele Barnett (1931–), m. Howard Suslak, president of McDonald & Co.
 Victor Barnett (1933–), chairman of Burberry, executive director of GUS and Experian; m. Helaine M. Barnett 
 Craig Barnett (1962–), Wall Street investment banker; m. Jennifer Peck, daughter of investor and philanthropist Stephen M. Peck
  Gabriel Barnett
 Roger Barnett (1964–), CEO of Shaklee; m. Sloan Lindemann, daughter of businessman George Lindemann Sr.
  Spencer Barnett (2000–)
 Rose Wolfson (1904–2003), m. Samuel Martyn of London
 Herman Martyn MBE
 Richard Martyn
  Mark Martyn
  Lee Martyn
  Marlene Martyn
  Eva Wolfson, m. Samuel Gerber
  Esther Wolfson, m. Joe Levy
 Bette Wolfson (1911–1993), m. Harold Schapiro of New York
 Stuart Schapiro
  Gerald Schapiro
 Dolly Wolfson (1913–1999), m. Joe Jacobson and then Robert Raisler of New York
  Steven Jacobson (1944–), m. Lynn Kaplan
 Hannah "Bebe" Wolfson, Lady Foley (1917–2015), m. Jack Steinberg of London and then Adrian Foley, 8th Baron Foley 
 Raymonde Steinberg, m. Ian Jay
  Kathrine Steinberg, m. Baron Jean-Louis de Gunzburg, a great-great-grandson of the first Baron Günzburg

See also 
 UCL Wolfson Institute
 Wolfson Medical School
 Wolfson Stadium, South Africa
 Wolfson Research Exchange
 Wolfson Centre for Magnetics
 Wolfson Molecular Imaging Centre
 Wolfson Neurorehabilitation Centre
 Wolfson Centre for Age-Related Diseases
 Wolfson Brain Imaging Centre
 Wolfson Institute of Preventive Medicine
 Royal Society Wolfson Fellowship

References

Bibliography
 3 volumes.

Business families of the United Kingdom
British Jewish families
British Jews
Jewish families
Noble families of the United Kingdom
Political families of the United Kingdom